Kamar Kuh (also Romanized as Kamar Kūh; also known as Kareh Mālīm (Persian: کره ماليم), Karam-Alu, and Karmālīm) is a village in Chavarzaq Rural District, Chavarzaq District, Tarom County, Zanjan Province, Iran. At the 2006 census, its population was 279, in 57 families.

References 

Populated places in Tarom County